Hrvoje Miličević (born 30 April 1993) is a Bosnian-Herzegovinian professional footballer who plays as a centre-back for Cypriot First Division club AEK Larnaca. A former youth international for Croatia, he plays for the Bosnia and Herzegovina national team.

Club career
Miličević started his career at Bosnian Premier League club Zrinjski Mostar. He made his debut for Pescara on 2 April 2017, in a 1–1 tie against Milan. Miličević wasn't registered by Pescara for the first half of the 2017–18 season and had his contract mutually terminated at the end of January 2018.

After Pescara, he played for Kazakhstan Premier League club Aktobe and another Bosnian Premier League club, Sarajevo, signing a six month contract with a possibility of a one year extension with the Bosnian club on 24 January 2020. He made his official debut for Sarajevo in a 6–2 league win against Tuzla City on 22 February 2020. He won his first trophy with Sarajevo on 1 June 2020, the league title, though after the 2019–20 Bosnian Premier League season was ended abruptly due to the COVID-19 pandemic in Bosnia and Herzegovina and after which Sarajevo were by default crowned league champions for a second consecutive time. On 18 June 2020, Miličević extended his contract with Sarajevo until June 2021. On 21 February 2021, he again extended his contract with the club until June 2022. In June 2021, Miličević terminated his contract with Sarajevo and left the club.

International career
Born in Bosnia and of Croatian descent, Miličević represented Croatia on various youth levels. He debuted for the Bosnia and Herzegovina national team in a 1–0 friendly loss to Georgia on 25 March 2022.

Career statistics

Club

Honours
Sarajevo
Bosnian Premier League: 2019–20
Bosnian Cup: 2020–21

References

External links
 
 

1993 births
Living people
Sportspeople from Mostar
Croats of Bosnia and Herzegovina
Association football central defenders
Croatian footballers
Croatia youth international footballers
Croatia under-21 international footballers
Bosnia and Herzegovina footballers
Bosnia and Herzegovina international footballers
HŠK Zrinjski Mostar players
Delfino Pescara 1936 players
S.S. Teramo Calcio players
 L'Aquila Calcio 1927 players
FC Aktobe players
FK Sarajevo players
AEK Larnaca FC players
Premier League of Bosnia and Herzegovina players
Serie B players
Serie A players
Serie C players
Kazakhstan Premier League players
Cypriot First Division players
Croatian expatriate footballers
Bosnia and Herzegovina expatriate footballers
Expatriate footballers in Italy
Croatian expatriate sportspeople in Italy
Bosnia and Herzegovina expatriate sportspeople in Italy
Expatriate footballers in Cyprus
Croatian expatriate sportspeople in Cyprus
Bosnia and Herzegovina expatriate sportspeople in Cyprus